Desouk Stadium is a multi-purpose stadium in Desouk, Egypt. It is used mostly for football matches. The stadium was opened on 1 January 1976. The stadium has a capacity of 3,000.

See also

 Desouk SC
 Ibrahim El-Desouki

Football venues in Egypt
Multi-purpose stadiums in Egypt
Desouk